Meridian Manor is an historic structure located in the  Columbia Heights neighborhood in the  Northwest Quadrant of Washington, D.C.  George T. Santmyers designed the structure in the  Colonial Revival style.   It exemplifies the speculative middle class apartment buildings that were constructed in Washington in the 1910s and 1920s near the 14th Street streetcar line.  It was listed on the National Register of Historic Places in 2001.

References

Columbia Heights, Washington, D.C.
Residential buildings completed in 1926
Apartment buildings in Washington, D.C.
Colonial Revival architecture in Washington, D.C.
Residential buildings on the National Register of Historic Places in Washington, D.C.